The 2015 British Columbia Scotties Tournament of Hearts, the provincial women's curling championship of British Columbia, was held from January 21 to 25 at Golden Ears Winter Club in Maple Ridge, British Columbia. The winning team represented British Columbia at the 2015 Scotties Tournament of Hearts in Moose Jaw, Saskatchewan

Teams
The teams were listed as follows:

Knockout Draw Brackets

A event

B event

C event

Knockout results

Draw 1
Wednesday, January 21, 6:30 pm

Draw 2
Thursday, January 22, 11:00 am

Draw 3
Thursday, January 22, 6:30 pm

Draw 4
Friday, January 23, 11:00 am

Draw 5
Friday, January 23, 6:30 pm

Draw 6
Saturday, January 24, 11:00 am

Playoffs

A vs. B
Saturday, January 24, 7:00 pm

C1 vs. C2
Saturday, January 24, 7:00 pm

Semifinal
Sunday, January 25, 8:30 am

Final
Sunday, January 25, 1:00 pm

References

British Columbia Scotties Tournament of Hearts
Scotties Tournament of Hearts
Curling in British Columbia
Maple Ridge, British Columbia
British Columbia Scotties Tournament of Hearts